Sisurcana ranunculata is a species of moth of the family Tortricidae. It is found in Colombia and Ecuador (Carchi Province).

References

Moths described in 1912
Sisurcana